Yes 50 Live is a double live album by English progressive rock band Yes, released on 2 August 2019 by Rhino Records.

Background
Yes reached their fiftieth anniversary year in 2018. To commemorate the milestone, the band—consisting of guitarist Steve Howe, drummer Alan White, bassist Billy Sherwood, keyboardist Geoff Downes, and lead vocalist Jon Davison—completed the 50th Anniversary Tour across Europe and the United States between March and July 2018. The five were joined by American drummer Jay Schellen, who performed the majority of Yes's live sets since 2016 while White recovered from surgery and a bacterial infection that affected his playing. The tour's set list included songs that spanned most of the group's history, from Time and a Word (1970), their second album, to Fly from Here (2011), their twentieth album.

Recording
Yes 50 Live was recorded on 20 and 21 July 2018 at The Fillmore Philadelphia in Philadelphia, Pennsylvania during the North American leg of the tour. It features the majority of the set list performed on the two nights. This particular leg featured guest performances from former keyboardists Tony Kaye and Patrick Moraz; Kaye joined the group for the encores ("Yours Is No Disgrace", "Roundabout", and "Starship Trooper") and Moraz plays on "Soon", the closing section to "The Gates of Delirium".

Sherwood, who has produced and mixed several Yes albums, reprises his role as the mixer on this album.

Release
The album was available as a 2-CD and 4-LP set, along with a colored vinyl pressing limited to 1,200 copies.

Critical reception

Stephen Thomas Erlewine of AllMusic gave the album three out of five stars and noted that it "adheres most closely to the prog rock that made their name in the early '70s" and that the current incarnation of the band "does this sound justice, which makes the album precisely what it's intended to be: a celebration of a particular time and sound, delivered with affection and skill".

Track listing

Personnel
Yes
Steve Howe – guitars, backing vocals, production
Alan White – drums, percussion, production
Geoff Downes – keyboards, production
Billy Sherwood – bass guitar, backing vocals, production, mixing
Jon Davison – lead vocals, acoustic guitar, percussion, production

with
Jay Schellen – additional drums, percussion
Tony Kaye – keyboards on "Yours Is No Disgrace", "Roundabout", and "Starship Trooper"
Patrick Moraz – keyboards on "Soon"

Production
Dean Mattson – recording
Maor Appelbaum – mastering
Roger Dean – painting, design, cover
Douglas Gottlieb – photography, design
Glenn Gottlieb – photography, design
Daniel Earnshaw – product manager

Charts

The album made #34 in the UK midweek album chart.

References

2019 live albums
Yes (band) live albums
Rhino Records live albums
Albums with cover art by Roger Dean (artist)